This is a compendium of the Filipino generals, commanders and who fought during the Philippine Revolution, Filipino-American War and the Post-war insurgencies against US occupation of the Philippines. There are 165 generals listed in this article.

General officers

Table Legend

Grade here refers to military, organizational, or leadership rank with regards to the Katipunan movement, governments of First Philippine Republic, and regional Federated states and provincial republics. Second, it also includes guerrilla-structured Post-Republic campaign during the Philippine–American War that includes "de facto" leadership, guerrilla leadership, "cacique" or chieftain leadership. Third,  leaders who are categorized as part of "bandolerisimo" leadership after Brigandage Act of November 12, 1902 (American-influenced Philippine legislature changed status of all Philippine Revolutionary Republican soldiers from enemy insurgent to "ladrones", "bandoleros" or "tulisanes" (bandits and outlaws), effectively criminalizing all resistance activities or revolts) are also described in this section. Fourth, Kolorum (Colorum) leaders and "generals" who heads religious and fanatic based rebel groups are also noted in this section.

Affiliation here refers to support of political fractions or individuals in the Katipunan movement, government of First Philippine Republic, or guerrilla-structured Post-Republic campaign during the Philippine–American War.

Province here refers to provinces or regions within the individual's areas of operational responsibilities.

Addendum
The Philippine American War or "Philippine Insurrection" has two phases. First phase was the conventional military warfare 
between two organized armies: The US Forces and the First Philippine Republican Army. This was period was from February to November 
1899. The second phase started from November 1899 when the Revolutionary army was dissipated into "guerrilla" -style warfare. This was based on smaller organized units of soldiers and local civilian supporters. Leadership became arbitrary with succession of "generals" and "commanders" based on who was second in command from the hierarchy of the old republic or who has more supporters or people under one's command. The remnants of the First Philippine Republic continued the struggle for independence into local regional and provincial levels as late as 1915.

References

Works cited in footnotes

 Almario, Virgilio (1998) *Rebolusyong Filipino, Intimas Memorias, memoirs of Colonel Sityar, in Spanish, page 197, translated to Tagalog by Almario

General references

 
 
 

 
 
 

Filipino generals
History of the Philippines (1565–1898)
Military personnel of the Philippine–American War
People of the Philippine–American War
People of the Philippine Revolution
Paramilitary Filipinos